Crassispira toulai is an extinct species of sea snail, a marine gastropod mollusk in the family Pseudomelatomidae, the turrids and allies.

Description

Distribution
Fossils have been found in Miocene strata in Martinique.

References

 Cossmann (M.), 1913 Étude comparative de fossiles miocéniques recueillis à la Martinique et à l'Isthme de Panama. Journal de Conchyliologie, t. 61, vol. 1, p. 1-64

toulai
Gastropods described in 1913